Saliena (formerly Salonāja) is the biggest village and the administrative centre of Saliena Parish, Augšdaugava Municipality in the Selonia region of Latvia.

External links 
Saliena Parish Council
Satellite map at Maplandia.com

Towns and villages in Latvia
Augšdaugava Municipality
Selonia